Sayed Mahmood Jalal (born 5 November 1980) is a Bahraini footballer currently playing with Al Muharraq Club of Bahrain and the Bahrain national football team.

After starting at Al-Shabab, Sayed Mahmood Jalal joined Bahrain league giants Muharraq in 2003 and soon became a national team regular. He started four of Bahrain’s six matches in the 2004 AFC Asian Cup before signing for Qatar’s Al Khreitiat that same year. In 2005, he moved to Qatari league rivals Al Siliya before returning to his former club Muharraq in October 2006. The much travelled Jalal was on the move again in February when he joined Qatar SC.

Goals for Senior National Team

References
 

1980 births
Living people
Bahraini footballers
Al Salmiya SC players
Expatriate footballers in Kuwait
Al-Sailiya SC players
Expatriate footballers in Qatar
Bahrain international footballers
Bahraini expatriate sportspeople in Kuwait
Al Kharaitiyat SC players
Bahraini expatriate sportspeople in Qatar
Qatar SC players
2004 AFC Asian Cup players
2007 AFC Asian Cup players
Footballers at the 2002 Asian Games

Association football midfielders
Asian Games competitors for Bahrain
Kuwait Premier League players
Qatar Stars League players
Al-Muharraq SC players
Al-Ahli Club (Manama) players